The Krokosua Hills Forest Reserve is a  forest reserve established in 1935 in Ghana.

Ape status
The last estimate of chimpanzee abundance in Ghana was made by Teleki's in 1989, which estimated between 300 and 500 chimpanzees present. No evidence of chimpanzees presence was found at the site during field surveys, however their presence was reported by hunters (Magnuson, 2002; Oates, 2006).

This forest has been heavily logged in the past. Evidence of logging in progress was also seen during field surveys in 1995 (Oates, 2006). Evidence of hunting is high at this site. It was estimated to 5.2 hunting signs per hour of scouting survey (Oates, 2006).

References

 McManus, E. (2005) Republic of Ghana. In: Caldecott, J., Miles, L. eds World Atlas of Great Apes and Their Conservation. Prepared at the UNEP World Conservation Monitoring Centre. University of California Press, Berkeley, USA.
 Oates, J. (2006) Primate Conservation in the Forests of Western Ghana. Unpublished report to the Wildlife Division, Forestry Commission, Ghana.

External links
Apes information

Forest reserves of Ghana